The Ross Macdonald Literary Award is a U.S. book prize given each year by the Santa Barbara Book Council to "a California writer whose work raises the standard of literary excellence." The award is named in honor of California mystery novelist Ross Macdonald, whose novels were set in a fictionalized version of Santa Barbara, California.

Past award recipients

External links
Santa Barbara Writers Conference
Blackbird's Nest — Behind the Literary Award

American literary awards